The Haggerston by-election was a Parliamentary by-election held on 1 August 1908. The constituency returned one Member of Parliament (MP) to the House of Commons of the United Kingdom, elected by the first past the post voting system.

Vacancy 
Sir Randal Cremer the sitting member died on 22 July 1908. He had been Liberal MP for the seat of Haggerston since the 1900 general election.

Electoral history 
The seat had been Liberal since they gained it in 1900. They easily held the seat at the last election, with an increased majority;

No Labour Party or Socialist candidate had ever stood. At the 1907 London County Council election The Conservative backed Municipal Reform Party had gained Haggerston from the Liberal backed Progressive Party.

Candidates 

 The local Liberal Association selected Walter Richard Warren to defend the seat. He was standing for parliament for the first time.
 The Conservatives retained 34-year-old Hon. Rupert Guinness as their candidate. He served as a captain in the Royal Naval Volunteer Reserve and was commanding officer of HMS President (London Division RNVR) from 1903. He was standing for parliament for the second time, having lost here in 1906. However, in 1907 he experienced electoral success in Haggerston when he was one of the two Municipal Reform candidates elected to serve on the London County Council
 The Socialist Social Democratic Federation chose to intervene in the by-election, and fielded Herbert Burrows a 63-year-old former civil servant from Suffolk, one of the organisers of the Matchgirls Strike. He was standing for parliament for the first time.

Campaign 
Polling Day was fixed for 1 August 1908.

Result 
The Conservatives gained the seat on a swing of 10.25%;

The result was seen as a victory for Tariff Reform and a disappointment to the third party Social Democratic Federation.

Aftermath 
Warren sought election to parliament at the next General Election at the Conservative seat of Wandsworth, without success. Guinness once again faced Burrows and a new Liberal candidate who defeated him;

Warren switched his attention to municipal politics and in March 1910, standing for the Liberal backed Progressive Party, he gained a seat from the Conservative backed Municipal Reform Party at Battersea in the 1910 London County Council election.

References 

Haggerston by-election
Haggerston by-election
Haggerston,1908
Haggerston,1908